Znamianka Druha is an urban-type settlement in Kropyvnytskyi Raion of Kirovohrad Oblast in Ukraine. It is located immediately west of the city of Znamianka. Znamianka Druha belongs to Znamianka urban hromada, one of the hromadas of Ukraine. Population: 

Until 18 July 2020, Znamianka Druha belonged to Znamianka Municipality. The municipality was abolished as an administrative unit in July 2020 as part of the administrative reform of Ukraine, which reduced the number of raions of Kirovohrad Oblast to four. The area of Znamianka Municipality was merged into Kropyvnytskyi Raion.

Economy

Transportation
Kolhospna and Znamianka-2 railway stations are located in Znamianka Druha, on the railway connecting Znamianka with Smila and Kropyvnytskyi. In Znamianka, there are further connections to Oleksandriia and Dolynska. There is some passenger traffic.

Highway M12 which connects the settlement with Kropyvnytskyi and Znamianka, where it has further connections to Kyiv and Dnipro.

References

Urban-type settlements in Kropyvnytskyi Raion